Arkansas Highway 30 may refer to:
Arkansas Highway 30 (1926-1958), now numbered 130 (and US 165)
Interstate 30 in Arkansas, created in the late 1950s